The Paw Paw Railroad is a defunct railroad which operated in Van Buren County, Michigan, between 1857 and 1887.

The Michigan Central Railroad had originally planned to reach the coast of Lake Michigan at St. Joseph, but these plans changed and the company built to New Buffalo instead. This meant that instead of passing through Paw Paw, the line passed through Lawton, some four miles (6 km) to the south. A group of local businessmen incorporated the Paw Paw Railroad on April 25, 1857, to construct a railway line from Paw Paw to Lawton, where it would join the Michigan Central.  An initial attempt, which aimed east of Lawton, resulted in the partial creation of a grade but no track was laid. The so-called "calico grade" was later developed, briefly, by the Kalamazoo, Lake Shore & Chicago. A second attempt, in 1867, led to the completion in September of that year of a  line between Paw Paw and Lawton, which was opened for public use. This constituted the total physical extent of the Paw Paw.

The two companies remained separate, but in 1877 the Paw Paw's line was converted to  gauge to permit joint operations.

On March 7, 1887 the Paw Paw merged with the T&SH and ceased to exist as an independent company. Throughout its history, the Paw Paw was specifically exempt from those sections of Michigan's railroad law which regulated rates and fares.

In 1903 it passed along with the SH&E to the Pere Marquette Railway, which finally abandoned the line in 1941.

Notes

References 

Railway companies established in 1857
Railway companies disestablished in 1886
Defunct Michigan railroads
Paw Paw Railroad
Predecessors of the Pere Marquette Railway
Narrow gauge railroads in Michigan
3 ft gauge railways in the United States
1857 establishments in Michigan